List of squares in Saint Petersburg.

 
Squares
Squares